The Academy of Medicine in midtown Atlanta, Georgia, was built in 1941 and housed the Medical Association of Atlanta until the 1970s. The building is listed on the National Register of Historic Places, and is also designated as a historic building by the City of Atlanta. It is currently owned by the Georgia Institute of Technology.

Construction
The Academy was designed by the Atlanta architecture firm of Hentz, Adler & Shutze, with R. Kennon Perry the project architect and Philip Trammell Shutze the supervising principal. The building was intended as a meeting place for Atlanta physicians. Shutze's austerely classical design is reminiscent of the work of John Soane and Benjamin Latrobe.<ref>Sams, Gerald W. (ed): AIA Guide to the Architecture of Atlanta', page 107. University of Georgia Press, 1993.</ref>

Recent history

By the 1970s, the building had fallen into disrepair. The building was renovated in 1983 and is used by the public as well as the medical profession.

In 2008, Atlanta Medical Heritage, Inc. donated the Academy of Medicine to the Georgia Tech Foundation, Inc. due to lack of resources to maintain the facility. The Georgia Tech Foundation accepted the gift on behalf of the Georgia Institute of Technology, and the building's name, Academy of Medicine, must be retained. Additionally, the properties' designation on the National Register of Historic Places, prevents the university from redeveloping the site or undergoing any improvements inconsistent with the Academy's historical significance.

The property is undergoing restoration for community and campus use, and has been retrofitted to serve the larger community as an event facility. The spacious auditorium provides seating for 250, and may be used for ceremonies, seminars, musical performances or lectures. The building also has a large central rotunda with a domed ceiling from which the chandelier from Gone with the Wind'' hangs, which host weddings.

See also 
 National Register of Historic Places listings in Fulton County, Georgia

References

External links

 Academy of Medicine historical marker

Cultural infrastructure completed in 1941
University and college buildings on the National Register of Historic Places in Georgia (U.S. state)
Buildings and structures in Atlanta
City of Atlanta-designated historic sites
National Register of Historic Places in Atlanta
Buildings and structures completed in 1901
1901 establishments in Georgia (U.S. state)